Kian Emadi-Coffin (born 29 July 1992) is a British track cyclist. He has represented Great Britain and England at international level, and is a three-time British National Track champion.

Career
Born and raised in Stoke-on-Trent, Emadi-Coffin started cycling competitively at the age of 13, and raced in many disciplines (track, road and cyclo-cross), before concentrating on the sprint disciplines of track racing. Emadi moved to Manchester at the age of 18 as a member of the British Cycling Podium Programme.

He represented Great Britain at the 2013 UCI Track Cycling World Championships and England at the 2014 Commonwealth Games. He won his first senior medal, a silver in the team sprint, at the latter event.

After suffering a back injury in September 2014, which limited the amount of gym work he could do to attempt to secure a place in the British team sprint squad for the 2016 Summer Olympics, Emadi-Coffin switched to the endurance squad.

Personal life
Emadi-Coffin, born to an American academic mother and an Iranian father, attended St Peter's Church of England High School and then moved to St Joseph's Sixth Form School in Stoke to study for A levels.

Major results

Track

2009
 National Junior Championships
1st  Sprint
1st  Kilo
3rd  Keirin
 Apeldoorn Interland
1st Team sprint
2nd Sprint
2nd Elimination
3rd Keirin
2010
 National Junior Championships
1st  Kilo
1st  Keirin
2nd  Sprint
2011
 3rd  Team sprint, National Championships
 Revolution 33 – 2nd Sprint, Revolution Series
2012
 1st  Kilo, National Championships
 2nd Kilo, UCI World Cup, Cali
 2nd Sprint omnium, Six Days of Bremen
2013
 National Championships
1st  Kilo
1st  Team sprint
 1st Team sprint, Cottbuser Nächte
 UCI World Cup
2nd Team sprint, Aguascalientes
3rd Team sprint, Manchester
 Dutch Summer Trophy, Alkmaar
2nd Kilo
3rd Sprint
2014
 2nd   Team sprint, Commonwealth Games
2016
 UCI World Cup
1st Team pursuit, Glasgow
3rd Team pursuit, Hong Kong
 3rd  Team pursuit, UEC European Championships
2017
 1st Team pursuit, UCI World Cup, Manchester
2018
 1st  Team pursuit, UCI World Championships
 2nd  Team pursuit, Commonwealth Games
2019
 2nd  Team pursuit, UCI World Championships
2021
 3rd  Team pursuit, UCI World Championships

References

External links

British male cyclists
1992 births
Living people
Sportspeople from Stoke-on-Trent
Commonwealth Games silver medallists for England
Cyclists at the 2014 Commonwealth Games
Commonwealth Games medallists in cycling
English people of Iranian descent
UCI Track Cycling World Champions (men)
British track cyclists
21st-century British people
Medallists at the 2014 Commonwealth Games